Princess Chudharatana Rajakumari or Phra Chao Boromwongse Ther Phra Ong Chao Chudharatana Rajakumari (RTGS: Chutharat Ratchakumari) (17 December 1872 – 31 December 1930), was a Princess of Siam (later Thailand. She was a member of Siamese Royal Family. She is a daughter of Chulalongkorn, King Rama V of Siam.

Her mother was The Noble Consort (Chao Chom Manda) Morakot Phenkul, daughter of Lord (Phraya) Mahindrasakdi Dhamrong and Dame (Thanpuying) Hunn Phenkul. She had a younger brother, Prince Benbadhanabongse, Prince of Phichai. She died on 31 December 1930, at the age of 58.

Royal Decoration
  Dame Cross of the Most Illustrious Order of Chula Chom Klao (First class): received 26 November 1926

Ancestry

1872 births
1930 deaths
19th-century Thai women
20th-century Thai women
19th-century Chakri dynasty
20th-century Chakri dynasty
Thai female Phra Ong Chao
Dames Grand Cross of the Order of Chula Chom Klao
Children of Chulalongkorn
Daughters of kings